The WWII/Korea LVT Museum is located in a Quonset hut-style building at Camp Del Mar, Marine Corps Base Camp Pendleton, California, near the Assault Amphibian School Battalion Training Command. It houses exhibits on landing vehicles tracked (LVTs) from World War II and the Korean War, including six vintage models used by the US Marine Corps. The museum highlights the service of the "Alligator" Marines during the amphibious assaults of World War II and the Korean War. In 1996, the museum won the prestigious Colonel John H. Magruder III Award from the Marine Corps Heritage Foundation.

See also
Amphibious Assault Vehicle
Korean War National Museum

Notes

External links

"Gator Gallery" Web article in amtrac.org website.

Museums in San Diego County, California
Military and war museums in California
Korea
Marine Corps museums in the United States
Korean War museums
World War II museums in the United States